2,5-Hexanedione (Acetonylacetone) is an aliphatic diketone.  It is a colorless liquid. In humans, it is a toxic metabolite of hexane and of 2-hexanone.

Symptoms of poisoning
The chronic toxicity of hexane is attributed to hexane-2,5-dione. The symptoms are tingling and cramps in the arms and legs, followed by general muscular weakness.  In severe cases, atrophy of the skeletal muscles is observed, along with a loss of coordination and vision problems.

Similar symptoms are observed in animal models.  They are associated with a degeneration of the peripheral nervous system (and eventually the central nervous system), starting with the distal portions of the longer and wider nerve axons.

Mechanism of action
It appears that the neurotoxicity of 2,5-hexanedione resides in its γ-diketone structure since 2,3-, 2,4-hexanedione and 2,6-heptanedione are not neurotoxic, whereas 2,5-heptanedione and 3,6-octanedione and other γ-diketones are.

2,5-Hexanedione reacts with lysine residues in axonal proteins by Schiff base formation followed by cyclization to give pyrroles. Oxidation of the pyrrole residues then causes cross-linking and denaturation of proteins, which perturbs axonal transport and function and causes damage to nerve cells.

Synthesis
2,5-Hexanedione has been prepared in several ways.  A common method involves hydrolysis of 2,5-dimethylfuran, a glucose derived heterocycle.

Uses
Acetonylacetone can be used in the synthesis of isocarboxazid, rolgamidine, and mopidralazine.  Treatment with P4S10 gives 2,5-dimethylthiophene.

References

Diketones